Sembadel (Auvergnat: Sant Badèu) is a commune in the Haute-Loire department in south-central France.

Geography
The Senouire has its source in the commune.

Population

See also
Communes of the Haute-Loire department

References

Communes of Haute-Loire